Diabaté is a surname. Notable people with the surname include:

Abdoulaye Diabaté (born 1956), Malian singer and guitarist
Cheick Diabaté (born 1988), Malian football player
Cyrille Diabaté (born 1973), French mixed martial arts fighter
Henriette Diabaté (born 1935), Côte d'Ivoire politician and writer
Lassina Diabaté (born 1974), former Côte d'Ivoire football player
Mamadou Diabaté (born 1973), Burkinabe balafon player
Mamadou Diabaté (born 1975), Malian kora player
Massa Makan Diabaté (1938–1988), Malian historian, author and playwright
Moussa Diabaté (born 2002), French basketball player
Sidiki Diabaté, Malian kora player
Toumani Diabaté (born 1965), Malian kora player
Zié Diabaté (born 1989), Côte d'Ivoire football defender

Surnames of African origin